The 2006 MuchMusic Video Awards were held on June 18, 2006 and featured performances by Fall Out Boy, Hedley, Rihanna, City and Colour, Simple Plan and others. The most nominated artists were Billy Talent, Kardinal Offishall f. Ray Robinson and Massari with 5 nominations each.

Awards

Best Video
 Kardinal Offishall f. Ray Robinson — "Everyday (Rudebwoy)"
 Billy Talent — "Devil in a Midnight Mass"
 Buck 65 — "Devil's Eyes"
 Nickelback — "Photograph"
 The Trews — "So She's Leaving"

Best Director
 Kardinal Offishall f. Ray Robinson — "Everyday (Rudebwoy)" (directed by: RT!)
 Billy Talent — "Devil in a Midnight Mass" (directed by: Sean Michael Turrell)
 Stars — "Your Ex-Lover Is Dead" (directed by: Experimental Parachute Moment)
 Massari — "Be Easy" (directed by: RT!)
 The Trews - "So She's Leaving" (directed by: Stephen Scott)

Best Post-Production
 The Trews — "So She's Leaving"
 Billy Talent — "Devil in a Midnight Mass"
 The Arcade Fire — "Neighbourhood#3 (Power Out)"
 Metric — "Poster of a Girl"
 Mobile — "Out of My Head"

Best Cinematography
 Buck 65 — "Devil's Eyes"
 Billy Talent — "Devil in a Midnight Mass"
 Kardinal Offishall f. Ray Robinson — "Everyday (Rudebwoy)" (Claudio Miranda)
 Massari — "Be Easy"
 Metric — "Poster of a Girl"

Best Pop Video
 Massari — "Be Easy"
 Bedouin Soundclash — "Shelter"
 City and Colour — "Save Your Scissors"
 Hot Hot Heat — "Middle of Nowhere"
 Kardinal Offishall f. Ray Robinson — "Everyday (Rudebwoy)"

MuchLOUD Best Rock Video
 Nickleback — "Photograph"
 Billy Talent — "Devil in a Midnight Mass"
 Hedley — "On My Own"
 Simple Plan — "Crazy"
 The Trews — "So She's Leaving"

MuchVibe Best Rap Video
 Classified — "No Mistakes"
 Alias Donmillion — "Dirty Dot"
JDiggz — "Puush It Up"
 Sweatshop Union — "Try"
 Jelleestone f. Nelly Furtado — "Friendamine"

Best Independent Video
 Metric — "Poster of a Girl"
 Broken Social Scene — "7/4 (Shoreline)"
 City and Colour — "Save Your Scissors"
 Massari — "Be Easy"
 Neverending White Lights f. Dallas Green — "The Grace"

MuchMoreMusic Award
 Michael Bublé — "Save the Last Dance for Me"
 Bedouin Soundclash — "Shelter"
 Daniel Powter — "Bad Day"
 Feist — "Mushaboom"
 Sam Roberts — "The Gate"

Best French Video
 Stéphanie Lapointe — "La Mer"
 André — "Yolande Wong"
 Anik Jean — "Tendre sorcière"
 Les Cowboys Fringants — "Plus rien"
 Marie-Mai — "Rien"

Best International Video - Artist
 Rihanna — "SOS"
 James Blunt — "You're Beautiful"
 Kanye West f. Lupe Fiasco — "Touch the Sky"
 Kanye West f. Jamie Foxx — "Gold Digger"
 Kelly Clarkson — "Behind These Hazel Eyes"
 Madonna — "Hung Up"
 Mariah Carey — "Don't Forget About Us"
 Ne-Yo — "So Sick"
 Pink — "Stupid Girls"
 Sean Paul — "Temperature"

Best International Video - Group
 Green Day — "Wake Me Up When September Ends"
 Angels & Airwaves — "The Adventure"
 Fall Out Boy — "Dance, Dance"
 Franz Ferdinand — "Do You Want To"
 Green Day — "Jesus of Suburbia"
 Panic! at the Disco — "I Write Sins Not Tragedies"
 Pussycat Dolls f. Busta Rhymes — "Don't Cha"
 Red Hot Chili Peppers — "Dani California"
 The All-American Rejects — "Dirty Little Secret"
 The Black Eyed Peas — "My Humps"

People's Choice: Favourite International Group
 Fall Out Boy — "Dance, Dance"
 Coldplay — "Speed of Sound"
 Green Day — "Wake Me Up When September Ends"
 Pussycat Dolls f. Busta Rhymes — "Don't Cha"
 Black Eyed Peas — "My Humps"

People's Choice: Favourite International Artist
 Kelly Clarkson — "Because of You"
 James Blunt — "You're Beautiful"
 Kanye West — "Gold Digger"
 Mariah Carey — "Shake It Off"
 Rihanna — "S.O.S. (Rescue Me)"

People's Choice: Favourite Canadian Group
 Simple Plan — "Crazy"''
 Hedley — "321"
 Nickleback — "Photograph"
 Our Lady Peace — "Angels/Losing/Sleep"
 Theory of a Dead Man — "Santa Monica"

People's Choice: Favourite Canadian Artist
City and Colour — "Save Your Scissors"
 Bif Naked — "Let Down"
 Kardinal Offishall f. Ray Robinson — "Everyday (Rudebwoy)"
 Massari — "Real Love"
 Sam Roberts — "The Gate"

Performers
Rihanna
Hedley
City and Colour
Metric
Simple Plan
Nelly Furtado f. Timbaland
Yellowcard
Fall Out Boy
Nick Lachey

References 

  (NB view the html source of the archived page)

External links
 

MuchMusic Video Awards
Muchmusic Video Awards, 2006
Muchmusic Video Awards, 2006
2006 in Canadian music